New English School is a secondary school located in Puntamba. School was established by educational organisation Rayat Shikshan Sanstha in 1961.

Affiliation
School is government aided and affiliated to  Maharashtra State Board of Secondary and Higher Secondary Education. School provides education from grade 5 to grade 12.

Campus
School campus is located in outer northern part of a village. School has three buildings for different grades. School has a big playground with parking space.

References

Schools in Maharashtra